In geometry, the rhombitetraheptagonal tiling is a uniform tiling of the hyperbolic plane. It has Schläfli symbol of rr{4,7}. It can be seen as constructed as a rectified tetraheptagonal tiling, r{7,4}, as well as an expanded order-4 heptagonal tiling or expanded order-7 square tiling.

Dual tiling 
The dual is called the deltoidal tetraheptagonal tiling with face configuration V.4.4.4.7.

Related polyhedra and tiling

References
 John H. Conway, Heidi Burgiel, Chaim Goodman-Strass, The Symmetries of Things 2008,  (Chapter 19, The Hyperbolic Archimedean Tessellations)

See also

Uniform tilings in hyperbolic plane
List of regular polytopes

External links 

 Hyperbolic and Spherical Tiling Gallery
 KaleidoTile 3: Educational software to create spherical, planar and hyperbolic tilings
 Hyperbolic Planar Tessellations, Don Hatch

Hyperbolic tilings
Isogonal tilings
Uniform tilings